Desikar, Desigar  or Pandaram  is a Tamil-speaking pandaram community from the Indian states of Tamil Nadu and Kerala. They are particularly priests and land owners.

Origin of Desikar

The Desikar community is a very ancient one which promotes the Saivite religion. This community especially focuses on Saiva Siddhanta and Thirumurai. The caste Desikar or Desigar is derived from the word pandram meaning "sage" in Tamil. There are different theories concerning the meaning of the word Pandaram. The caste Pandaram comprises two divisions, Abhishekar and Desikar. But the later name Desikar was taken as a title.

Dhikshai process
Those who lead a celibate life wear lingam. They became Saivas by getting Dhikshai.

"Samaya"
"Nirvana, Visesha"
"Kala sothanai" 
"Abhishekam"

are the few stages of Dhikshai practice.

Some act as temple servants, supplying flowers for God and singing hymns.
So, they used to be called Meikaval (Bodyguard of the God) and Oduvar (reader).

Divisions in Pandaram
Desikar is a sub-division of community known as 'Pandaram'. The Pandarathar caste is composed of respectable people. The name pandaram means valuable storing place of jewels, navarathnas stored in the temples and palaces, they are placed to maintain the jewels of temples and palaces. They are land holders, traders, sanyasis (monk), priests (guru) and managers of richly endowed temples.

These managers are commonly called Thambiran. They are all vegetarians and staunch believers of Saiva Siddantha.

Abhisheka Pandaram has to pass through few ceremonies related to Saiva Agama.

The Mendigate Pandarams, recruited from a few other classes, wear the lingam but do not abstain from eating flesh.

Some of the sub-castes of the predominant Desikar community are:
 Desikar- head of mutt.
 Abhisheka - person who do pooja in temple and mutt.
 Oduvar - the reader who sing thirumurai in temple and mutt.
 Meikaval - the staff or worker in temple or mutt.
 thambiran - managers of mutt.

Distribution
The community is distributed throughout Tamil Nadu and also in Kerala, Malaysia, Sri Lanka and Singapore. However, they form a significant proportion of population in the southern districts of Tamil Nadu.

Marriage and their customs

They do not mingle with other castes by marriage; but some do marry from other castes like Saiva Vellalars and other Vellalar sub caste.

List of Adheenam / Mutts in Tamil Nadu

 Velakurichi Adheenam
 Mailam Bommapuram Adheenam
 Thiruvaduthurai Adheenam
 Sivagiri Adheenam
 Perur Veera saiva Adheenam
 Thiruvannamalai-Kundrakudi Adheenam 
 Suriyanarkoil Adheenam
 Thiruppanandal Adheenam
Madurai Adheenam 
 Senkol Adheenam
 Thuzhavoor Adheenam
 Kamakshipuri Adheenam
 Pollachi Adheenam
 Dindigul sivapuram adheenam
 AvaduthuRai Adeenam
 Dharmapuram Adheenam

Desikar Mutts in brief 

The pioneer who established Adheenam (Mutts, Dynasty) are known as "Desikar" or "Desikar Paramacharya", pontiff in English. Most of the pontiffs are Brahamacharis that maintain celibacy. Only a few became Samsaris. So only few mutts followed the successive pontiff by lineage. But most of the Adheenam select the pontiff by "Guru Shishya Parambara". Ancient Tamil history pronounces that Saivaite religion or sector doesn't have the casteism. After the invasion of the other races, casteism played a prominent role in the Saivaite unknowingly. So the successive pontiffs are selected or elected from the so-called various communities. Hence few of the descend from the Desika Paramacharya lineage.

Velakurichi Adeenam
Tamil Nadu is pronominally a traditional state. Here are several important and noteworthy temples apart from Math’s. Hindu Religious Charitable Endowment Department regulates and controls most of these temples through its administration. A Temple is an institution of prehistoric antiquity, having continuity of existence through centuries and through many political upheavals in the land. They have played prominent role in the history, not only in the promotion of religion but also in the promotion of social and cultural life of the people. The Law of Karma and Re-incarnation is the major belief of Hinduism.

It is one among the various institutions spreading the message of Hinduism for many centuries in south India. The founder of the velakurichi Mutt is Sathyagnana Desika Deerga Dharsinigal. He descended from ‘God Siva’ one Sri Kandaparamasivam. The Velakurichi mutt was founded in the 15th century on the banks of Thamirabarani River in Velakurichi village, a part of Ambasamudram Taluk, Thirunelvely District.

The peculiarity of the mutt, as distinct from the other mutts is, a ‘Grahastha – Sanyasi’ managing the mutt, where as the Heads of the other mutts like Thiruvaduthurai Adheenam, Kanchipuram Adheenam and Dharmapuram Adheenam are pure ‘Naistiga – Sanyasis’. By custom in succession the Velakurichi Adheenam, controls and supervise the four famous temples viz,

The adheenam is the hereditary trustee of Five temples in Thanjavur District:

 Agniswarar Temple, Thiruppugalur
 Utharapatheswarar Temple, Thiruchenkattankudy
 Meganatha Swami Temple, Thirumeeyachur
 Thiyagaraja Swami Temple of Abhiseka Kattalai
 Annadhana Kattalai, Thiruvarur

Thuzhavoor Adheenam
 is current .

Notables

Tamil literature
 Kambar (poet), belongs to uvacha sect of pandaram caste
Perur Santhalinga Swamigal, Spiritual Writer, Sidhar (Monk with spiritual powers)
T. V. Sadasiva Pandarathar, Archeologist, Tamil Historian
Kumara Swamy Desikar, saiva spiritual writer
Velaiyar, Eminent Tamil poet
Karunai Prakasar, saiva spiritual writer

Music
Dandapani Desikar

Arts and cinema
MM Dandapani Desigar a noted musical scholar
Aparna Pillai, actress

References 

Tamil society
Social groups of Tamil Nadu
Tamil diaspora in Asia
Indian castes